Robert Parsons (ca. 1535 – January 1571/2) was an English composer of the Tudor period who was active during the reigns of King Edward VI, Queen Mary I and Queen Elizabeth I. He is noted for his compositions of church music.

Early life
Parsons was born around 1530–35, but no details of his birth survive and there is no evidence connecting him with either Robert Parsons (1596-1676), a vicar choral at Exeter Cathedral, or his contemporary, the composer William Parsons of Wells. Although little is known about his life, it is likely that in his youth he was a choir boy, as until 1561 he was an assistant to Richard Bower, Master of the Children of the Chapel Royal.

Career and influence

Parsons was composing during a period of major religious upheaval in England. After the death of Henry VIII in 1547, the new king, Edward VI, advanced the Reformation in England, introducing major changes to the liturgy of the Church of England. In 1549, Thomas Cranmer's new Book of Common Prayer swept away the old Latin-language liturgy and replaced it with prayers in English. This brand new liturgy suddenly demanded that new music be written in English for the church, and musicians of the Chapel Royal such as Thomas Tallis, John Sheppard, and Parsons were called upon to demonstrate that the new Protestantism was no less splendid than the old Catholic religion. 

During the reign of Mary Tudor (1553–1558), a revival of Catholic practice encouraged a return to Latin music, but after Elizabeth I ascended to the throne of England in 1558, vernacular English liturgy and music came back into favour.

Parsons was appointed Gentleman of the Chapel Royal on 17 October 1563. His work consisted of a number of sacred and secular vocal compositions. His earliest known composition is his First Service, a setting of text from the 1549 Prayer Book of King Edward VI and his largest surviving work.  Its existence suggests that Parsons was actively composing from at least the early 1550s. This work contained settings of the canticles for the new services of Morning (Venite, Te Deum, Benedictus) and Evening Prayer (Magnificat and Nunc Dimittis), as well as a setting of the Credo and short Responses to the Ten Commandments for the Holy Communion service. 

Parsons is especially noted for his choral motets, and he is recognised as a master of polyphonic writing for choirs with the skilled use of cantus firmus within his works. Notable works include his setting of Ave Maria, the anthem Deliver me from mine enemies, and some instrumental pieces. Eight of these works were included in the music manuscript known as the Dow Partbooks, and several of his vocal works also feature in the Drexel and Peterhouse partbooks. Parsons was the first English composer to write a setting of the Office for the Dead, and he was possibly influenced by the work of Alfonso Ferrabosco, an Italian composer who was active in England at the time.

Parsons worked with other composers of his day and it is thought that he collaborated with Richard Farrant on dramatic productions during the early 1560s. Similarities have been demonstrated between John Sheppard's 1558 Second Service and Parsons's First Service, suggesting that Parsons was greatly influenced by Sheppard's compositional style. Parsons is also closely connected with the composer William Byrd. Parsons's influences can be traced in Byrd's instrumental works and choral motets. The two musicians lived and worked in the county of Lincolnshire; in 1567, Parsons was granted a Crown lease on a rectory at Stainton in Lincolnshire,  from Hainton, where Byrd resided, and it is thought that Parsons may have taught Byrd at Lincoln Cathedral.

Works

English works
The First Service (also known as The Great Service)
The Second 'Excellent' Service for Means(evening canticles to the Second Service composed by William Mundy in tribute to Parsons)

English anthems
Deliver me from mine enemies
Holy Lord God Almighty

Consort songs
Abradad: Alas you salt sea gods
Enforced by Love and Fear
No grief is like to mine
Pour down you powers divine

Latin works

 Ave Maria
 Credo quod redemptor meus vivit
 Domine, quis habitabit
 Iam Christus astra ascenderat
 In manus tuas
 Retribue servo tuo
 Libera me, Domine, de morte aeterna
 Magnificat
 O bone Jesu
 Peccantem me quotidie

Death and legacy

Parsons is believed to have died in January 1571/2, when he fell into the then swollen River Trent at Newark-on-Trent in Nottinghamshire and drowned. His sudden death was marked with great sadness as he had gained considerable acclaim as a composer. The eulogy at his funeral (published in the Dow Partbook) lamented the fact that his life had been cut short at a young age:

There is no record of Parsons's body ever having been retrieved from the river following his death. His son, John Parsons (1563–1623), was a minor composer who served as organist of Westminster Abbey (1621–23). William Byrd succeeded Parsons as Gentleman of the Chapel Royal.

Today, Parsons's surviving compositions form part of the repertoire of Anglican church music. His Ave Maria was included in the 1978 publication, the Oxford Book of Tudor Anthems.

References

The Parsons Affayre – Recording of all the Latin motets of Robert Parsons
St Martin's Chamber Choir – Biography of Robert Parsons
Naxos Biographies – Robert Parsons
Here Of A Sunday Morning Radio Programme – Robert Parsons

See also
Tudor music
List of Anglican church composers

External links

 http://www.geocities.jp/lyrischesuite/Parsons.htm
: a 1973 performance by Guildford Cathedral Choir, directed by Barry Rose

English classical composers
Renaissance composers
1530s births
1572 deaths
People of the Elizabethan era
Gentlemen of the Chapel Royal
Musicians from Exeter
Accidental deaths in England
Deaths by drowning in the United Kingdom
16th-century English composers
English male classical composers